Saint-Pierre-les-Dames (L'Abbaye royale de Saint-Pierre-les-Dames de Reims) was a convent of Benedictine nuns established in the city of Reims for over a thousand years, from the early Middle Ages to the time of the French Revolution. The monastery was certainly in existence by the reign of Charlemagne, and according to some sources dated from as early as the 6th century, although it has been argued that the earlier date could be due to confusion with a different and shorter-lived monastery in the city, also dedicated to St Peter.

Renée de Lorraine (1522–1602), daughter of Claude, Duke of Guise, was abbess for 56 years, from 1546 to her death, throughout the French Wars of Religion. In 1560 her sister, Mary of Guise, mother of Mary, Queen of Scots, was buried in the abbey church. During the same year, Mary Queen of Scots herself spent some time in the abbey when mourning the death of her first husband, Francis II of France, as well as her mother, and she donated his prayer book to the monastery library.

References

Further reading
 Henri Jadart, Le Trésor de l'abbaye de Saint-Pierre-les-Dames de Reims en 1690, communication à l'Académie de Reims, le 28 février 1908 (1908)

Reims
Benedictine nunneries in France